M-56 was the designation given to two former state trunkline highways in the U.S. state of Michigan:
M-56 (1919–1957 Michigan highway) from Monroe to Flat Rock
M-56 (1971–1987 Michigan highway) in Flint